Malvern College Chengdu is a British international school in Tianhui town (天回镇), Jinniu District in Chengdu, Sichuan, China. It is affiliated with Malvern College in the United Kingdom. It has IGCSE/A Level education.

The school includes boarding facilities.

References

External links
 Malvern College Chengdu

British international schools in China
International schools in Chengdu
Boarding schools in China
Educational institutions established in 2015
2015 establishments in China